The women's marathon competition of the athletics event at the 2015 Southeast Asian Games was held on 7 June at the Kallang Practice Track in Singapore.

Records
Prior to this competition, the existing Asian and Games records were as follows:

Schedule
All times are Singapore Standard Time (UTC+08:00)

Results

References

External links
 

Women's marathon
Women's sports competitions in Singapore
2015 in women's athletics
Southeastasian
2015 Southeast Asian Games